Dvorishnevo is a rural locality (a village) in Muromtsevskoye Rural Settlement, Sudogodsky District, Vladimir Oblast, Russia. The population was 14 as of 2010.

Geography 
Dvorishnevo is located 14 km south of Sudogda (the district's administrative centre) by road. Alferovo is the nearest rural locality.

References 

Rural localities in Sudogodsky District